The Tone River is a river in the South West of Western Australia.

The headwaters of the river rise South West of Kojonup and flow in a south-westerly direction crossing Muirs Highway  through Strachan then discharging into the Warren River in Lake Muir Nature Reserve.

The Tone River and Upper Kent rivers were investigated in the 1980s in relation to salinity issues.

The river has four tributaries, Cockatoo Creek, Chowerup Creek, Murrin Brook and Mettabinup Creek.

References

Rivers of the South West region